Fuad Issa al-Jouni (also Fouad; ; born 1950) is a former Minister of Industry for Syria. He was previously a professor of mechanical engineering at the University of Aleppo. He holds a Ph.D. in metallurgy from the University of Sheffield in the United Kingdom.

References

1950 births
Living people
Alumni of the University of Sheffield
Syrian ministers of industry
Academic staff of the University of Aleppo